Kevin Finneran is an American lacrosse coach. In 2006, he was the head coach and general manager of Major League Lacrosse's Chicago Machine. Prior to becoming the team's first head coach Finneran had played in the MLL. He played with the Long Island Lizards from 2001 to 2004 and the Philadelphia Barrage in 2005.

Kevin also played box lacrosse in the National Lacrosse League. He spent 12 years and won four NLL Championships with the Philadelphia Wings before signing as a free agent with the Toronto Rock, where he played one season and won another championship.

Kevin played for Team USA in the Heritage Cup in both 2002 and 2004, and was named the captain of the 2004 team. He played his college ball at Ohio Wesleyan where he was a first Team All-American Midfield, was coached by Mike Pressler and played in the 1989 NCAA Division III Lacrosse Championship.

His brother Brian Finneran, a former Director of Catering at the "21" Club and Tavern on the Green, is a well known event producer in New York City. 

Kevin Finneran served as the Director of Lacrosse of IMG Academy from May 2010 to February 2011.

Statistics

NLL

MLL

References

Living people
National Lacrosse League All-Stars
Philadelphia Wings players
Toronto Rock players
American lacrosse players
Major League Lacrosse coaches
Major League Lacrosse major award winners
Year of birth missing (living people)
Ohio Wesleyan Battling Bishops men's lacrosse players